Southwold Lifeboat Station is an RNLI operated lifeboat station located in the town of Southwold in the English county of Suffolk.

The Atlantic 85 is the third generation Rigid Inflatable Boat (RIB) in the B-class series. The lifeboat has a manually operated self-righting mechanism and can be beached in an emergency without sustaining damage to engines or steering gear. She is easy refloat and is ideal for rescues close to shore and on the sandbanks which are along the coast at Southwold.

The lifeboat is operated by a crew of around 18 volunteers. Charity abseil events at Southwold lighthouse raised over £20,000 for the lifeboat in both 2009 and 2011.

History
A lifeboat was first stationed in the town in 1841 with the first motorised boat being put into service in 1926. The station's lifeboat, Mary Scott, took part in the Dunkirk evacuation in 1940. She was towed to Dunkirk by the paddle steamer Emperor of India together with two other small boats. Between them they took 160 men to their mother ship, then made a journey with 50 men to another transport vessel. She was abandoned on the beach, recovered and returned to service with the RNLI at Southwold.

An inshore lifeboat station equipped with a D class lifeboat was established in 1963. This was replaced by a B class Atlantic 21 lifeboat, Sole Bay, in 1973. Medal Services – 1972: Bronze Medal Patrick Pile and Martin Helmer. 1981: Bronze Medal Helmsman Roger Trigg.

Description
The current boathouse was built in 1993 near the entrance to Southwold Harbour at the mouth of the River Blyth. A winch and davit are used to launch the boat. These were repositioned in 2012 following essential repair work carried out to the harbour wall.

Neighbouring lifeboat stations are located in Lowestoft and Aldeburgh along the North Sea coast.

Fleet

All Weather lifeboats

No. 1 station

No. 2 station

Inshore Lifeboats

D-class

B-class

References

External links
Southwold lifeboat station - RNLI website

Lifeboat stations in Suffolk
Southwold